The discography of a Polish band 2 Plus 1 consists of ten studio albums, twenty compilation albums, three EPs, and twenty-nine singles. Three of their studio albums (Nowy wspaniały świat, Easy Come, Easy Go and Bez limitu) have been certified Gold in Poland for selling in over 150,000 copies each. 2 Plus 1 have released seventeen singles in Poland, nine in Germany, two in Japan, and one in Cuba.

Studio albums

Compilation albums

EPs

Singles

References

External links 
 2 Plus 1 at Discogs
 2 Plus 1 at Rate Your Music
 2 Plus 1 at KPPG

2 Plus 1
Folk music discographies
Pop music group discographies
Rock music group discographies